Aksu is one of the main water streams of Giresun Province in the eastern Black Sea Region of Turkey. Its name is Turkish for "white water".

Description
Aksu Deresi rises in Karagöl, a rural highland area located very near to provincial borders of Giresun, Ordu and Sivas provinces. Karagöl is a chain of mountains which is part of the Giresun mountains, in the south of Dereli district of Giresun, and its summit is 3107 meters high. The Aksu creek flows down to the Black Sea passing Kızıltaş, Sarıyakup,  and Güdül villages. Its mouth is next to the eastern part of Giresun city.

Rivers of Giresun Province
Rivers of Turkey